The Overstory is a novel by Richard Powers published in 2018 by W. W. Norton & Company. It is Powers' twelfth novel. The book is about nine Americans whose unique life experiences with trees bring them together to address the destruction of forests. Powers was inspired to write the work while teaching at Stanford University, after he encountered giant redwood trees for the first time.

The Overstory was a contender for multiple awards. It was shortlisted for the 2018 Man Booker Prize on September 20, 2018 and won the 2019 Pulitzer Prize for Fiction on April 15, 2019, as well as the William Dean Howells Medal in 2020. Reviews of the novel have been mostly positive, with praise of the structure, writing, and compelling reading experience.

Patricia Westerford, one of the novel's central characters, was heavily inspired by the life and work of forest ecologist Suzanne Simard. Westerford pens the fictional novel The Secret Forest, whose title mirrors other popular texts such as The Hidden Life of Trees: What They Feel, How They Communicate – Discoveries from a Secret World by German forester Peter Wohlleben, The Secret Life of Trees by British science writer Colin Tudge, and Finding the Mother Tree by Simard herself.

Plot
The Overstory is divided into four sections, titled 'roots', 'trunk', 'crown', and 'seeds', mirroring the life cycle of a tree.

Roots
On the Hoel farm in Iowa, a sentinel chestnut tree survives the blight, becoming a beloved tree for four generations of Hoels. The last Hoel, Nicholas, returns to the farm on Christmas day to find his entire family has perished from propane asphyxiation.

Winston Ma, a Chinese American, has three daughters. To honor his own father, Winston plants a mulberry tree. When he takes his own life beneath the mulberry, his eldest daughter, Mimi, is left to divide the family heirlooms, which includes three jade rings and an ancient scroll.

In the Appich family, a tree is planted for each child. Adam's tree is a maple. After Adam's older sister goes missing, he loses interest in his insect avocation, and his grades slip. His passion for knowledge is rekindled after finding a book on social psychology. While there, he learns about the bystander effect. 

Ray Brinkman and Dorothy Cazaly begin dating, but Dorothy struggles with commitment because she sees it as a form of ownership. They finally get married and make plans to plant something in their yard every year on their anniversary. 

After enduring the Stanford prison experiment, Douglas Pavlicek enlists in the U.S. Air Force. Doug's plane is shot down, and he falls out into a banyan tree. He is discharged and becomes a caretaker on a horse ranch. While driving through Oregon, he is disturbed by the sight of clear-cut hillsides. He takes a job planting thousands of Douglas fir seedlings. 

As a boy, Neelay Mehta becomes obsessed with computers. While climbing a California live oak, Neelay falls and becomes paralyzed from the waist down. While at Stanford University, he receives inspiration from the campus trees and decides to create an immersive world video game where players conquer, expand, and interact over game content. 

Patricia Westerford learns about trees from her father. She studies botany and forestry in college. While completing research, she discovers trees communicate with each other through chemicals. Her findings are denounced by a few prominent scientists. She loses her job and retreats into solitary life, nearly killing herself. Later, she meets two scientists who tell her that her research has been redeemed in the scientific community. She joins them at their research station and begins investigating trees once more. 

While at college studying Actuarial Science, Olivia Vandergriff is accidentally electrocuted and her heart stops.

Trunk
After ninety seconds, Olivia's heart restarts. She senses beings of light who want her to leave school to join activists working to save the California redwoods. On the way, she stops at Nick Hoel's farm, and he agrees to go with her. 

Mimi and Douglas are brought together when a grove of ponderosa pines is cut down in the middle of the night. Together, they decide to join activists to defend trees, both getting arrested. Eventually, they make their way to the same activist group Olivia and Nick join.

Neelay starts his own company, becoming extremely successful with his Mastery games. Patricia writes a bestselling book called The Secret Forest. Adam decides he is going to write his dissertation on the psychological profiles of environmental activists. Dorothy and Ray struggle to conceive a child, and Dorothy begins having an affair. 

Nick and Olivia take their turn living in the branches of a giant redwood called Mimas to protect it from logging. Their vigil lasts for months instead of days. Dorothy asks Ray for a divorce, but Ray suddenly has a stroke and almost dies. 

Adam interviews Nick and Olivia atop Mimas. While there, they are threatened by a helicopter and forced down; all three are sent to jail and Mimas is cut down. Adam decides to join Nick, Olivia, Mimi, and Doug in Oregon. Each takes on a new name: Mimi is Mulberry, Doug is Doug-fir, Adam is Maple, Nick is Watchman, and Olivia is Maidenhair. Frustrated with their progress to stop old-growth logging, the group decides to take matters into their own hands and begin burning logging equipment. During their final arson attempt, the explosion goes awry and Olivia is killed.

Crown
Olivia dies from the explosion, and the rest of the group flee the scene. Adam returns to graduate school and becomes a respected professor in the field of psychology. Nick lives a transient life, making activist art. Mimi changes her name and becomes a therapist. Doug lives in the secluded remnants of a mining town in Montana.

Dorothy cares for Ray after his stroke. They bond over their plants, especially the trees they planted in their yard. Patricia starts a seed vault to preserve trees that will soon be extinct. Neelay becomes unhappy with his Mastery games and wants to use technology to learn how to preserve the natural world.

A tourist finds Doug's journal with information about the group's arson activities, and Doug is arrested. To protect Mimi, he decides to identify Adam as an accomplice.

Seeds
Neelay leaves his company and creates artificial intelligences to learn about Earth's biomes. Adam pleads guilty to his crimes and is sentenced to 140 years in prison. Mimi realizes what Doug and Adam did for her and achieves a kind of enlightenment. Ray and Dorothy decide to let their yard grow wild without human interference, until Ray has a second stroke and dies. Nick continues to make art, and the novel finishes with the completion of an enormous natural sculpture that spells out the word "STILL" big enough to be seen from space.

Characters
 Nicholas Hoel – an artist of Norwegian and Irish descent who comes from a long line of farmers and whose great-great-great grandfather planted a chestnut tree that survived blight for decades and enthralled the Hoel family for generations.
 Mimi Ma – the eldest daughter of Winston Ma, born Ma Sih Hsuin, who fled China and became an engineer in America. She is deeply affected when her father eventually commits suicide.
 Adam Appich – an inquisitive boy who is fascinated with insects and later becomes interested in human psychology and how humans can only understand things that are put into narratives. His father planted a tree before the birth of each of his children; as a child, Adam conflated the characteristics of each tree with his siblings.
 Ray Brinkman – a conventional intellectual property lawyer and Dorothy's husband, who later in life, following a stroke, falls in love with nature.
 Dorothy Cazaly – an unconventional stenographer who falls in love with nature late in life.
 Douglas Pavlicek – an orphan who enlists in the Stanford prison experiment before joining the Air Force. He falls from his plane and is saved by a banyan tree. After being discharged, he wanders across America, realizing as he does so that deforestation is ruining the country. He signs up to plant seedlings, only learning after the planting of his fifty-thousandth seedling that this effort does nothing to help trees and only contributes to their destruction at the hands of logging companies.
 Neelay Mehta – the child of Indian immigrants, spends his life building computers and creating computer programs in northern California. Despite being paralyzed when he falls out of a tree as a child, he goes on to become a computer programming marvel, eventually creating a series of video games called Mastery, inspired by trees, deforestation, and colonization.
 Patricia Westerford – a dendrologist with a hearing disability, she spends most of her childhood and adulthood enthralled by trees. When she accidentally discovers that trees are capable of communicating with each other, her research is widely mocked, leading her to contemplate suicide. She eventually finds work as a park ranger where, years later, she discovers that her work has been redeemed and expanded upon.
 Olivia Vandergriff – a young woman in her early twenties who lives an impulsive and reckless life until dedicating herself to protesting deforestation.

Reception
The Atlantic called the novel "darkly optimistic" for taking the long view that humanity was doomed while trees are not. The Guardian was mixed on the novel, with one review claiming that Powers mostly succeeded in conjuring "narrative momentum out of thin air, again and again"; another reviewer excoriated the novel as being an "increasingly absurd melodrama". Library Journal called the book "a deep meditation on the irreparable psychic damage that manifests in our unmitigated separation from nature". Ron Charles of The Washington Post offered up effusive praise, writing that this "ambitious novel soars up through the canopy of American literature and remakes the landscape of environmental fiction".

Television adaptation
In February 2021, it was reported that Netflix was developing a television adaptation of the novel with David Benioff, D.B. Weiss, and Hugh Jackman executive producing.

Awards
 2018 Man Booker Prize shortlist
 2018 Grand Prix de Littérature Américaine winner
 2019 2019 PEN/Jean Stein Book Award finalist
 2019 2019 PEN/Faulkner Award finalist
 2019 Pulitzer Prize for Fiction
 2020 William Dean Howells Medal

Further reading
 Richard Powers and nature writing Open Book, Alex Clark interviews Richard Powers, 0:00-12 min, BBC Radio 4 podcast, August 28, 2018, accessed September 2, 2018.

References

English-language novels
Novels by Richard Powers
2018 American novels
W. W. Norton & Company books
Environmental fiction books
Fictional trees
Climate change novels
Pulitzer Prize for Fiction-winning works